The UEFA Women's Player of the Year Award (previously known as the UEFA Best Women's Player in Europe Award) is an association football award given to the female footballer that is considered the best player playing for a women's football club in Europe during the previous season. The award was announced in 2013, two years after the creation of the UEFA Best Player in Europe Award, the equivalent award for male footballers.

Nadine Angerer, Lena Goeßling, and Lotta Schelin made the shortlist for the inaugural year, with Nadine Angerer being selected as the winner on 5 September 2013 during the round of 32 and 16 draws for the 2013–14 UEFA Women's Champions League.

Criteria and voting

According to UEFA, players are selected based on their performances that year in "all competitions, both domestic and international, and at club and national team levels". For the inaugural award, players were nominated by the coaches of the twelve national teams that made the group stage of the UEFA Women's Euro 2013 competition and the coaches of the eight club teams that made the quarterfinals of the 2012–13 UEFA Women's Champions League. The nominees were then voted on by eighteen sports journalists that cover women's association football, chosen by trade organization European Sports Media. Each of the voters selected their pick for the top three players, giving their first choice five points, their second choice three points, and their third choice one point. From this initial round of voting, a three player shortlist is selected and the fourth through tenth-place finishers are determined. The winner, runner up, and third-place finisher are selected from the shortlist during a second round of voting, which takes place during the round of 32 and 16 draws for the UEFA Women's Champions League.

Award history

Winners

By player

By country

By club

Finalists

2012–13

Sources:

2013–14

Sources:

2014–15

Sources:

2015–16

Source:

2016–17

Source:

2017–18

Source:

2018–19

Source:

2019–20

Source:

2020–21

Source:

2021–22

Source:

See also

 List of sports awards honoring women

References

External links
 

Best Women's Player in Europe
Eur 2
Women's association football player of the year awards
Awards established in 2013